Coaster or Coasters may refer to:

Amusements
 Roller coaster, a form of fun ride
 Coaster, the dragon mascot of the Playland (New York) theme park

Arts and media
 Coaster (album), by punk rock band NOFX
 The Coaster, a weekly newspaper in Asbury Park, New Jersey, U.S.
 The Coasters, an American doo-wop band
 Coaster (video game), a 1993 roller coaster simulator
 Coaster Step, a dance step
 Coaster, a 2000 album by The Bobs

Transport
 Coaster (commuter rail), a regional rail service in San Diego County, California, U.S.
 Toyota Coaster, a minibus model
 Coaster brake, a type of bicycle brake
 Coastal trading vessel, a ship used for trade within a coastline

Other uses
 Drink coaster, on which to rest a cup
 Coaster trout (Salvelinus fontinalis), a fish native to Northern America's Lake Superior
 Demonym for people from New Zealand's West Coast

See also
Coastie, a pejorative term
West Coaster (disambiguation)